Between Us may refer to:
Between Us (2012 film), a feature film, based on play of same title
Between Us (2004 film), a short film
Between Us (2003 film), a short film by Laurits Munch-Petersen
Between Us (2016 film), a 2016 American drama film
Between Us (Hayden James album), 2019
Between Us (Lala Karmela album), 2013
Between Us (Little Mix album), 2021
Between Us (Murray Head album), 1979
Between Us (Steve Cole album), 2000
Between Us (Tab Two album), 1999
"Between Us" (CNBLUE song), 2017
Between Us, a Swedish band with releases from Burning Heart Records
"Between Us", by Lala Karmela from the album Between Us
"Between us", by Streetwalkers from the album Red Card
"Everything (Between Us)", by Liz Phair from the album Somebody's Miracle

See also 
Just Between Us (disambiguation)